Parliamentary elections were held in Norway on 9 and 10 September 1973. The Labour Party remained the largest party, winning 62 of the 155 seats in the Storting.

Results

Seat distribution

Notes

References

1973
1973
Norway
1973 in Norway
September 1973 events in Europe